Gul may refer to:

Places 
 Gul, South Khorasan, Iran
 Gul, West Azerbaijan, Iran
 Gul Circle, Singapore

Other uses 
 Great Liberal Union (GUL), a Nicaraguan political party 
 Gul (design), a design element in oriental carpets
 Gul (name)
 Gul (toothpaste), a tobacco preparation used in Central Asia and eastern India
 Gul (watersports), a British watersports apparel manufacturer
 Gül Mosque, in Istanbul, Turkey
 Gül Train, a freight train service between Pakistan and Turkey via Iran
 Gul, a fictional Cardassian military rank in the Star Trek franchise
 Goulburn Airport, IATA airport code "GUL"

See also
 
 Ghoul
 Gular (disambiguation)
 Gull